The following games were initially announced as PlayStation 2 titles, however were subsequently cancelled or postponed indefinitely by developers or publishers.

References

2

PlayStation 2